The Charles W. Merrill House is a 6,000-square-foot residence built in 1938 and located in Orinda, California. Designed by regionally prominent architect Walter H. Ratcliff, of Berkeley, California for mining engineer and San Francisco businessman Charles Washington Merrill.

History 
Built in 1938, the house's architecture reflects elements of Spanish Colonial Revival architecture. However, with the house's two stories, low-pitched roofline, and second-story balcony on the front elevation, it also reflects Monterey style architecture, popular in large California homes built between 1925 and 1940.

The house and grounds were designed as a small country estate. The house occupies a hillside location and is sited on two stonework terraces, pierced by three stone staircases placed among gardens designed by landscape architect Mabel Symmes in 1938–1939.

The house is significant under Criterion B for its association with the final stage of Charles W. Merrill's long and distinguished career. Merrill lived in the house during the period in which he presided over a highly diversified engineering corporation, with worldwide influence, that had grown from Merrill's pioneering patents and discoveries of the 1890s and 1900s. The house also is significant under Criterion C as an example of the eclecticism that architect Walter H. Ratcliff brought to his architecture. Built in the mature phase of Ratcliff's career, the Merrill House with its elements of Spanish Colonial Revival and Monterey styles reflect Ratcliff's distinctive blend of academic eclecticism and keen awareness of regional topography, climate, and setting.

See also
National Register of Historic Places listings in Contra Costa County, California

References

 Charles W. Merrill House, Contra Costa County, California.  Listed in the National Register of Historic Places, 7 April 2005.  Link to full text of nomination:  
 Robert W. Ratcliff.  The Ratcliff Architects.  An oral history conducted by the Regional Oral History Office of The Bancroft Library, University of California.  Berkeley: University of California, 1990.
 David W. Ryder.  The Merrill Story. San Francisco: The Merrill Company, 1958.

External links 
, from the NRHP nomination form.

Houses on the National Register of Historic Places in California
National Register of Historic Places in Contra Costa County, California
Houses completed in 1938
Houses in Contra Costa County, California